Hoang Phuc Pagoda (literally: Great Blessing, Hán tự: 弘福寺) is a pagoda located in Thuan Trach Village, Mỹ Thủy Commune, Lệ Thủy District, Quảng Bình Province, North Central Coast Region of Vietnam. The pagoda has a history of more than 700 years, one of the oldest temples in Central Vietnam.

History
In 1301 king of Trần dynasty, Trần Nhân Tông visited this temple, then called Tri Kien Temple. Nguyễn Phúc Chu, a lord of Nguyen family renamed this temple Kính Thiên Tự (Kinh Thien Temple) in 1716. King Minh Mạng of Nguyễn dynasty visited this temple in 1821 and renamed this temple Hoằng Phúc Tự (Han tu: 弘福寺), colloquially called chùa Trạm or Chùa Quan (Trạm Temple or Quan Temple).

The pagoda has been rebuilt several times. It was severely devastated by a tropical hurricane in 1985, nothing much remained but the gate and the foundation of the temple and its 80-kg bell, some old Buddha statues. 
The temple was included in the list of Quang Binh provincial relics.

In December 2014, the reconstruction of the pagoda started. On 16 January 2016, the new pagoda was inaugurated with the participation of several officials from the government of Vietnam, members of the Buddhist Shanghas of Vietnam and Myanmar, Cambodian King of the Monk Tep Vong, and Buddhist followers across Vietnam. Hoang Phuc pagoda is recognized as a national historical relic of Vietnam.
On the inaugural day, The Myanmar Buddhist Sangha presented Buddha's śarīra from Shwedagon Pagoda in Yangon to Hoang Phuc Pagoda.

References

Buddhist temples in Vietnam
Pagodas in Vietnam
Quảng Bình province